Thomas Henry Cullen (March 29, 1868 – March 1, 1944) was an American businessman and politician from New York who served thirteen terms in the U.S. House of Representatives from 1919 to 1944.

Biography 

Born in Brooklyn, Cullen attended the local parochial schools, and graduated from St. Francis College in 1880. He engaged in the marine insurance and shipping business.

Early political career 
Cullen was a member of the New York State Assembly (Kings Co., 3rd D.) in 1896, 1897 and 1898.

He was a member of the New York State Senate (3rd D.) from 1899 to 1918, sitting in the 122nd through 141st New York State Legislatures.

He was a delegate to the 1912, 1916, 1920, 1924, 1928 and 1932 Democratic National Conventions; and a member of the New York State Commission for the Panama–Pacific International Exposition in 1915.

Congress 
Cullen elected as a Democrat to the Sixty-sixth and to the twelve succeeding Congresses and held office from March 4, 1919, until his death in Washington, D.C., in 1944; interment was in Holy Cross Cemetery, Brooklyn.

See also
 List of United States Congress members who died in office (1900–49)

References
 
 State of New York at the Panama-Pacific International Exposition, San Francisco, California, 1915 (Albany, 1916; pg. 27)

1868 births
1944 deaths
Politicians from Brooklyn
Democratic Party members of the New York State Assembly
Democratic Party New York (state) state senators
St. Francis College alumni
Democratic Party members of the United States House of Representatives from New York (state)
Burials at Holy Cross Cemetery, Brooklyn